Lloyd Cassel Douglas (August 27, 1877 – February 13, 1951) was an American minister and author.

Douglas was one of the most popular American authors of his time, although he did not write his first novel until he was 50.

Biography 
He was born in Columbia City, Indiana, spending part of his boyhood in Monroeville, Indiana, Wilmot, Indiana and Florence, Kentucky, where his father, Alexander Jackson Douglas, was pastor of the Hopeful Lutheran Church.  According to the 1910 Census Douglas was listed as a Lutheran clergyman.  He was married to Bessie I. Porch.  They had two children: Bessie J. Douglas, 4 at the time and Virginia V Douglas, 2 at the time.

After receiving the A.M. degree from Wittenberg College (now Wittenberg University) in Springfield, Ohio, in 1903, Douglas was ordained in the Lutheran ministry. He served in pastorates in North Manchester, Indiana, Lancaster, Ohio, and Washington, D.C. From 1911 to 1915, he was director of religious work at the University of Illinois at Urbana-Champaign. The next six years, he was minister of The First Congregational Church in Ann Arbor, Michigan, from there moving to Akron, Ohio, and serving as the Sr. Minister of the First Congregational Church of Akron from 1920 to 1926, then to Los Angeles, California, and finally to St. James United Church in Montreal, Quebec, from which pulpit he retired to write.  His biographer, Louis Sheaffer, comments, "he never stated publicly why he changed denominations."

His first novel, Magnificent Obsession, published in 1929, was an immediate success. Critics held that his type of fiction was in the tradition of the great religious writings of an earlier generation, such as Ben-Hur and Quo Vadis. Magnificent Obsession was adapted for the screen twice, first in 1935 in a film starring Robert Taylor and Irene Dunne, and in 1954, with Rock Hudson and Jane Wyman.

Douglas then wrote Forgive Us Our Trespasses; Precious Jeopardy; Green Light; White Banners; Disputed Passage;  Invitation To Live; Doctor Hudson's Secret Journal; The Robe, and The Big Fisherman, In 1937, Green Light was made into a film starring Errol Flynn. White Banners, starring Claude Raines and Fay Bainter, came to the screen in 1938. The film of Disputed Passage was released in 1939.   Dr. Hudson's Secret Journal , a prequel to The Magnificent Obsession, aired on syndicated television in 1955-1957. John Howard starred as Dr. Wayne Hudson in 78 episodes.  

The Robe sold more than 2 million copies, without any reprint edition.  Douglas sold the motion picture rights to The Robe, though the film, starring Richard Burton, was not released until 1953, after Douglas's death.

His own unhappy experience of filming prompted Douglas, when he produced The Big Fisherman as the sequel to The Robe, to stipulate that The Big Fisherman would be his last novel and that he would not permit it to be made into a motion picture, used over the radio, condensed, or serialised. Eventually, The Big Fisherman was filmed in 1959, starring Howard Keel in one of his few non-singing screen roles as Peter.

His last book was the autobiographical Time To Remember which described his life up to his childhood and education for the ministry. He died before he was able to write the intended second volume, but the task was completed in The Shape of Sunday by his daughters, Virginia Douglas Dawson and Betty Douglas Wilson.

Douglas died in Los Angeles, California. He is buried in Forest Lawn Memorial Park Cemetery in Glendale, California.

Works
Source:

Novels 

Magnificent Obsession series:
 Magnificent Obsession (1929), 
 Doctor Hudson's Secret Journal (1939), prequel

The Robe series:
 The Robe (1942), 
 The Big Fisherman (1948), 

Stand-alones:
 More Than a Prophet (1905), 
 Forgive Us Our Trespasses (1932), 
 Precious Jeopardy: A Christmas Story (1933), 
 Green Light (1935), 
 White Banners (1936), 
 Home For Christmas (1937), 
 Disputed Passage (1939), 
 Invitation to Live (1940),

Non-fiction 

 Wanted – A Congregation (1920), religion
 An Affair Of The Heart (1922), religion
 The Minister's Everyday Life (1924), religion
 These Sayings of Mine: An Interpretation of the Teachings of Jesus (1926), religion
 Those Disturbing Miracles (1927), religion
 The College Student Facing A Muddled World (1933), sociology
 Time to Remember (1951), autobiography
 The Living Faith: Selected Sermons (1955), religion

Other 

 The Fate Of The Limited (1919)

Adaptations 

 Magnificent Obsession (1935), film directed by John M. Stahl, based on novel Magnificent Obsession
 Green Light (1937), film directed by Frank Borzage, based on novel Green Light
 White Banners (1938), film directed by Edmund Goulding, based on novel White Banners
 Disputed Passage (1939), film directed by Frank Borzage, based on novel Disputed Passage
 The Robe (1953), film directed by Henry Koster, based on novel The Robe
 Demetrius and the Gladiators (1954), film directed by Delmer Daves, based on novel The Robe
 Magnificent Obsession (1954), film directed by Douglas Sirk, based on novel Magnificent Obsession
 Dr. Hudson's Secret Journal (1955-1957), series directed by Peter Godfrey and Harry R. Sherman, based on novel Doctor Hudson's Secret Journal
 Luz da Esperança (1956), series based on novel Green Light
 Sublime Obsessão (1958), series directed by Dionísio Azevedo, based on novel Magnificent Obsession
 The Big Fisherman (1959), film directed by Frank Borzage, based on novel The Big Fisherman

References

Further reading
 .
  (by his daughters).
 .
 .

External links

 
 Works by Lloyd C Douglas at Project Gutenberg Australia
 Lloyd C. Douglas at web site of Ronald R. Johnson
 

1877 births
1951 deaths
20th-century American male writers
20th-century American novelists
20th-century American Lutheran clergy
American historical novelists
American male novelists
Burials at Forest Lawn Memorial Park (Glendale)
Lutheran writers
Novelists from Indiana
Novelists from Ohio
People from Allen County, Indiana
People from Columbia City, Indiana
People from Florence, Kentucky
People from North Manchester, Indiana
Wittenberg University alumni
Writers from Akron, Ohio